Władysław Dziewulski (2 September 1878 – 6 February 1962) was a Polish astronomer and mathematician. He spent most his life performing astronomical research, and published over 200 papers.

Life
He studied mathematics and astronomy in his native Warsaw. Then in 1902 he went to the University of Göttingen in Germany to complete his education. In 1903, he was named as an assistant at the astronomical observatory in Kraków that belonged to the Jagiellonian University and in 1906, he gained his PhD there.  In 1919, he became a professor of the Batory University in Vilna and director of its Astronomical Observatory. He was also the rector of Batory University in 1924–25. Later he moved to Nicolaus Copernicus University in Toruń. He spent the last part of his life in Toruń.

He focused  on the gravitational perturbations of minor planets, movements of stellar groupings, and photographic photometry.

The crater Dziewulski on the Moon is named after him, as is the Wladyslaw Dziewulski Planetarium in Toruń.

References

20th-century Polish astronomers
Scientists from Warsaw
University of Göttingen alumni
Academic staff of Jagiellonian University
Academic staff of Nicolaus Copernicus University in Toruń
Rectors of Vilnius University
1878 births
1962 deaths
19th-century Polish astronomers